The Estelle and Melvin Gelman Library, more commonly known as Gelman Library, is the main library of The George Washington University, and is located on its Foggy Bottom campus. The Gelman Library, the Eckles Library on the Mount Vernon campus and the Virginia Science and Technology Campus Library in Ashburn comprise the trio known as the George Washington University Libraries. The Himmelfarb Health Sciences Library and the Jacob Burns Law Library also serve the university. The Gelman Library is a member of the Washington Research Library Consortium and the Association of Research Libraries.

Organization

The seven-story library building contains over two million volumes. It is constructed in the Brutalist architectural style of the 1970s. It features a concrete façade punctuated by windows that are divided by projecting vertical slabs. For most of the year, parts of the library are open 24 hours per day, seven days per week for use by students, faculty and staff. The seventh floor is home to the National Security Archive, a research institution that publishes declassified U.S. government files concerning selected topics of American foreign policy. It was a National Security Archive Freedom of Information Act request that eventually made the Central Intelligence Agency's so-called "Family Jewels" public.

The seventh floor is also home to the Special Collections Research Center, Kiev Library, and Global Resources Center. Special Collections offers researchers a wide array of primary and secondary resources, as well as a large Washingtonia collection. Specializing in Hebrew and Judaica, the Kiev Library houses the leading collection of modern Judaica, rare books, maps, and archival materials related to Judaic studies among universities in the Washington, D.C. area. The Global Resource Center has numerous sources focusing on the twentieth century to present day that analyze political, socio-economic, historical, and cultural aspects of countries and regions from around the world.

The Gelman's base floor contains a Starbucks. The library is at the corner of 22nd and H Streets and is adjacent to Kogan Plaza.

With the death of Estelle Gelman on October 23, 2009, the library honored a promise made to the Gelman family to rename the Melvin Gelman Library with its new name, the Estelle and Melvin Gelman Library. On September 28, 2010, a small family gathering with remarks by President Steven Knapp celebrated Estelle Gelman's life and formally rededicated the building.

In 2010, students have made improvements to the Gelman Library a major target of their advocacy efforts at the university.

Renovations
The University hired architecture firm Cox Graae & Spack Architects in December 2010 to help determine the scope of a renovation project. By February 2011, the University announced the prospective plan for renovations. Provost Steven Lerman commented to GWToday, the university's official news source, “We are excited that the planning process for this renovation is moving forward. We have worked with the Student Association to involve students in this planning. Once we have a detailed design for the renovation, we'll move ahead with this important project as quickly as possible."

As part of the fiscal year 2012 operating and capital budgets, the George Washington University Board of Trustees approved a $16 million renovation project for Gelman Library. The project plan included renovations of the entrance level of the building. Moving the library entrance from H ST to Kogan Plaza, the new second floor plan presents learning commons featuring group study spaces with wireless technology and laptop bars. Construction began late May 2012.

After a little over one year of construction, Gelman library opened their new entrance floor to the public Monday, August 12, 2013.

The design upgrade, which focused on providing more natural light and open space for students, "boasts new amenities to meet modern students’ needs, such as more outlets to recharge laptops, and technology enabled study rooms." Such technologies a digital media lab where students may check out cameras for use, a digital visualization room containing a 3D screen to better examine data, and five additional "study rooms equipped with large monitors that can be connected to laptops to make collaboration on group projects easier." The unveiled second floor is completed with new laptop bars and a snack lounge equipped with two water bottle refill stations.

Notes

External links
Official website
Global Resources Center
Special Collections Research Center
Kiev Collection

George Washington University buildings and structures
Libraries in Washington, D.C.
University and college academic libraries in the United States
Foggy Bottom
Brutalist architecture in Washington, D.C.
Federal depository libraries